Alvarado is an unincorporated community in Richland Township, Steuben County, in the U.S. state of Indiana.

History
A post office was established at Alvarado in 1855, and remained in operation until 1904. An old variant name of the community was called Richland Center.

In 1849, the Alvarado United Methodist Church was built, and is still in service today.

Geography

References

Unincorporated communities in Steuben County, Indiana
Unincorporated communities in Indiana